Haripur is a village in the Bhopal district of Madhya Pradesh, India. It is located in the Berasia tehsil.

Demographics 

According to the 2011 census of India, Haripur has 105 households. The effective literacy rate (i.e. the literacy rate of population excluding children aged 6 and below) is 37.4%.

References 

Villages in Berasia tehsil